James John McAtee (born 18 October 2002) is an English professional footballer who plays as a midfielder for EFL Championship club Sheffield United on loan from Manchester City. He is also a current England under-21 international.

Club career

McAtee made his first appearance against a senior team for City's EDS squad in the EFL Trophy defeat against Bolton Wanderers on 29 October 2019. During the 2020–21 season McAtee also played in the EFL Trophy victories over Scunthorpe United, in which he played against his older brother John and Mansfield Town as well as the defeat against Tranmere Rovers. On 24 August 2021 he scored in a 3–0 victory over Scunthorpe United.

In November 2020 McAtee scored in a 3–2 victory against Chelsea in the final of the FA Youth Cup and subsequently scored eight goals with nine assists in twenty-three appearances as City were champions of 2020–21 Premier League 2.

On 21 September 2021, McAtee made his senior debut as a substitute for Josh Wilson-Esbrand in City's 6–1 home win over Wycombe Wanderers in the EFL Cup. On 21 November 2021, McAtee made his Premier League debut as a substitute for Cole Palmer in a 3–0 home win over Everton.

International career
In November 2019, McAtee made his international debut for England U18 and scored twice in a 4–4 draw with Norway.

On 6 September 2021, he scored one of England U20's goals in a 6–1 win over Romania.

On 6 June 2022, McAtee received his first call up to the England U21s. On 10 June 2022, McAtee made his U21 debut during a 2023 UEFA European Under-21 Championship qualification 5–0 victory away to Kosovo.

Personal life
McAtee is the younger brother of Grimsby Town striker John McAtee. Their father, paternal grandfather and great-uncles played rugby league professionally, and the football players and managers Alan Ball Sr. and Alan Ball Jr. are their maternal great-grandfather and great-uncle respectively.

Career statistics

Club

Honours

Club
Manchester City
FA Youth Cup: 2019–20

Individual
Man City EDS Players Player of the Year: 2021–22
Premier League 2 Player of the Month: August 2021
Premier League 2 Player of the Season: 2021–22

References

External links
 

2002 births
Living people
Footballers from Salford
English footballers
Association football midfielders
England youth international footballers
Manchester City F.C. players
Sheffield United F.C. players
Premier League players